The Subprefecture of Itaquera is one of 32 subprefectures of the city of São Paulo, Brazil.  It comprises four districts: Itaquera, Parque do Carmo, José Bonifácio, and Cidade Líder. The name in Tupi means "hard stone" or "insensitive stone".

This subprefecture hosts the Arena Corinthians stadium, in which took place the inauguration of the FIFA World Cup in 2014.

References

Subprefectures of São Paulo